The sport of football in Macau is run by the Associação de Futebol de Macau. The association administers the national football team as well as the national league. The national team has never qualified for the AFC Asian Cup or EAFF East Asian Championship. The team qualified for the 2006 AFC Challenge Cup, where they got one draw and two losses.

Special Administrative Region of the People's Republic of China, as a result the Sports and Olympic Committee of Macau, China is not recognized as a National Olympic Committee by the International Olympic Committee, the Macau national under-23 football team is unable to take part in the Olympic football tournament.

In November 2016, Macau finished second in the 2016 AFC Solidarity Cup. Due to the withdraw of Guam and suspension of Kuwait, Macau qualified for the 2019 AFC Asian Cup qualifying third round.

There are three major FIFA standard 11 a side football fields in Macau, they are:
Estádio Campo Desportivo
Macau University of Science and Technology Sports Field
Lin Fong Stadium

League system

Domestic tournaments 
 Taça da Associação de Futebol de Macau (Macau FA Cup) the national open cup.

Macau stadiums

References